Nova Gora is a small settlement in the Municipality of Dolenjske Toplice in Slovenia. The area is part of the historical region of Lower Carniola. The municipality is now included in the Southeast Slovenia Statistical Region.

References

External links
Nova Gora on Geopedia
Pre–World War II list of oeconyms and family names in Nova Gora

Populated places in the Municipality of Dolenjske Toplice